The 2011–12 Copa del Rey was the 110th staging of the Copa del Rey (including two seasons where two rival editions were played). The competition began on 31 August 2011 and ended on 25 May 2012 with the final, which was held at the Vicente Calderón Stadium in Madrid. Entering the competition, the winners were assured of a place in the group stage of the 2012–13 UEFA Europa League. Real Madrid were the defending champions, but were eliminated by Barcelona in the quarter-finals, who went on to win the title.

Calendar

Qualified teams 
The following teams competed in the Copa del Rey 2011–12:

20 teams of 2010–11 La Liga:

Almería
Athletic Bilbao
Atlético Madrid
Barcelona
Deportivo La Coruña
Espanyol
Getafe
Hércules
Levante
Málaga
Mallorca
Osasuna
Racing Santander
Real Madrid
Real Sociedad
Sevilla
Sporting Gijón
Valencia
Villarreal
Zaragoza

20 teams of 2010–11 Segunda División (Barcelona B and Villarreal B were excluded for being reserve teams):

Albacete
Alcorcón
Betis
Cartagena
Celta Vigo
Córdoba
Elche
Gimnàstic
Girona
Granada
Huesca
Las Palmas
Numancia
Ponferradina
Rayo Vallecano
Recreativo
Salamanca
Tenerife
Valladolid
Xerez

26 teams of 2010–11 Segunda División B. Teams that qualified were the top five teams of each of the 4 groups (excluding reserve teams) and the six with the highest number of points out of the remaining non-reserve teams (*):

Lugo
Guadalajara
Leganés
Alcalá
Vecindario
Eibar
Mirandés
Alavés
Real Unión
Palencia
Sabadell
Badalona
Alcoyano
Orihuela
Lleida Esportiu
Murcia
Melilla
Cádiz
San Roque Lepe
Ceuta
Logroñés*
Oviedo*
L'Hospitalet*
Sant Andreu*
Roquetas*
Jaén*

18 teams of 2010–11 Tercera División. Teams that qualified were the champions of each of the 18 groups (or at least the ones with the highest number of points within their group since reserve teams were excluded):

Cerceda
Marino
Noja
Amorebieta
Llagostera
Olímpic Xàtiva
Alcobendas Sport
Burgos
Comarca Níjar
Linense
Manacor
Lanzarote
UCAM Murcia
Villanovense
Tudelano
Náxara
Andorra
Toledo

First round 
The matches were played on 31 August 2011.

Alcalá, Cádiz, Sant Andreu, San Roque Lepe, Albacete, Roquetas, Orihuela and Alavés received a bye.

Second round 
The matches were played on 6, 7 and 8 September 2011.

Third round 
The draw for the third round was held on 15 September 2011 at 13:00 CEST at the Ciudad del Fútbol de Las Rozas in Madrid.

The matches were played on 12 October 2011.

Oviedo received a bye.

Final phase 
The draw for the Round of 32 was held on 14 October 2011 at 13:00 CEST in La Ciudad del Fútbol in Las Rozas, Madrid.

Like previous years, Segunda División B teams played against the La Liga teams which qualified for European competitions, this is: four teams from Pot 1 (Segunda B) were drawn against four teams from pot 2a (champions) and the three remaining teams in pot 1 were drawn in the same way with the pot 2b teams (Europa League). The five teams in Pot 3 (Segunda División) were drawn against five teams of the thirteen remaining teams of La Liga (Pot 4). The remaining eight teams of La Liga faced each other. The lowest ranked teams from each match played at home on the first leg and if two teams from a match played in the same division then the first one to come out of the draw played at home first.

The first leg was played on 13 December 2011 except for matches involving teams from Pot 2b, which were played on 8 December 2011 (due to Europa League – Round 6, except for Sevilla which were eliminated from the competition) and the match involving Barcelona which was played on 9 November 2011 (due to Barcelona's participation at the FIFA Club World Cup). The second leg was played on 22 December 2011.

Bracket

Round of 32 
The first leg matches were played on 9 November, 8 and 13 December while the second legs were played on 20, 21 and 22 December 2011.

|}

First leg

Second leg

Round of 16
The draw for Round of 16, Quarterfinals and Semifinals was held on 23 December 2011 at 10:00 CET in the Ciudad del Fútbol de Las Rozas in Madrid.

The first leg matches were played on 3, 4 and 5 January while the second legs were played on 10, 11 and 12 January 2012.

|}

First leg

Second leg

Quarter-finals
The first leg matches were played on 17, 18 and 19 January while the second legs were played on 24, 25 and 26 January 2012.

|}

First leg

Second leg

Semi-finals
The first leg matches were played on 31 January and 1 February while the second legs were played on 7 and 8 February 2012.

|}

First leg

Second leg

Final

Top goalscorers

See also 
 List of Spanish football transfers summer 2011
 List of Spanish football transfers winter 2011–12
 2011–12 La Liga
 2011–12 Segunda División
 2011–12 Segunda División B
 2011–12 Tercera División

References

External links 

MundoDeportivo.com 
Marca.com 
AS.com 

2011-12
1